is the forty-third single of Japanese solo artist Gackt, released on December 19, 2012. It was the theme song for Kissmark snowboarding brand commercial. The song was released by Gan-Shin in Europe in 2015.

Track listings and formats

Charts

Oricon

Billboard Japan

References

2012 singles
Gackt songs
2012 songs
Songs written by Gackt